Jean-Pierre Bordeleau (born June 13, 1949) is a Canadian former professional ice hockey player who played 519 NHL games between 1970 and 1980, all for the Chicago Black Hawks, the team that drafted him in the first round of the 1969 NHL Amateur Draft. He featured in the 1973 Stanley Cup Finals.

Bordeleau's brothers Christian Bordeleau and Paulin Bordeleau also played in the National Hockey League, as did his nephew Sebastien.

Career statistics

Regular season and playoffs

References

External links
 

1949 births
Living people
Canadian ice hockey forwards
Chicago Blackhawks draft picks
Chicago Blackhawks players
Dallas Black Hawks players
French Quebecers
Ice hockey people from Quebec
Montreal Junior Canadiens players
National Hockey League first-round draft picks
New Brunswick Hawks players
Sportspeople from Rouyn-Noranda